Aiborlang Khongjee (born 1987) is an Indian football plays as a defender. He mainly plays as a centre back, Aiborlang can also on the right back.

Early life
Aibor, as he is affectionately called, belongs to a small town named Lyngkhat in East Khasi Hills district in Meghalaya. Football was his love since school days. He had also played Subroto Cup for his school Raidlaban Higher Secondary School. After his Class X exams, he moved to Shillong to join the Sports Authority of India. He started watching international football, and soon became a fan of John Terry. He has been a fan of Chelsea. Among the Indian defenders, Mahesh Gawli has been his favourite. He left SAI in 2005, and joined the local team Shillong Lajong next year as a stopper back.

Career

East Bengal
In 2007, he was signed by Kolkata club East Bengal from Shillong Lajong. However, an injury-hit season meant that he got very few opportunities in the big club, and subsequently was sent back to his former club. However, Subrata Bhattacharya, the coach of the Red & Gold Brigade used Aiborlang as the side back for the first time.

Shillong Lajong
Having the experience of playing I-League for East Bengal, he was made the captain of the Shillong Lajong for the 2009–10 season, as they prepared for their I-League debut.
In the 2009–10 season, he had given the hosts an early lead from the spot kick against Mohun Bagan in the 54th minute, but later strikes from Chidi Edeh and Marcos Pereira meant the hosts lose 1–2.

Mohun Bagan
On 24 March 2013 in the 2012-13 I-League, he scored with a header on the 5th minute against Pailan Arrows, and then assisted Tolgay Özbey on the 19th minute.

Return to Shillong Lajong
In August 2014 Khonjee joined Shillong Lajong for the third time in his career.

Honours

India
 SAFF Championship: 2015

Shillong Lajong
 I-League 2nd Division: 2011

Personal life
Khonjee is a member of the Khasi people.

External links
 http://goal.com/en-india/people/india/29498/aibor-khongjee
 http://www.indianfootball.com/en/statistic/player/detail/playerId/698
 https://web.archive.org/web/20100425025723/http://www.shillonglajong.com/aibor-khongee

References

Indian footballers
1987 births
Living people
People from East Khasi Hills district
Khasi people
Footballers from Meghalaya
Shillong Lajong FC players
East Bengal Club players
Mohun Bagan AC players
I-League players
Indian Super League players
NorthEast United FC players
India international footballers
Association football defenders